Bedford is a city located in northeast Tarrant County, Texas, in the "Mid-Cities" area between Dallas and Fort Worth. It is a suburb of Dallas and Fort Worth. The population was 46,979 at the 2010 census. Bedford is part of the Hurst-Euless-Bedford Independent School District.

Geography

Bedford is located at  (32.846790, –97.139630).

Neighboring cities include Hurst and Euless.

Prominent highways include State Highway 121 and State Highway 183, also known as Airport Freeway (a reference to the Dallas/Fort Worth International Airport, so called because this was the main thoroughfare to the airport in the early years of its history).

Demographics

2020 census

As of the 2020 United States census, there were 49,928 people, 20,089 households, and 12,431 families residing in the city.

2000 census
As of the census of 2000, there were 47,152 people, 20,251 households, and 12,515 families residing in the city. The population density was 4,713.6 people per square mile (1,820.5/km2). There were 21,113 housing units at an average density of 2,110.6 per square mile (815.2/km2). The racial makeup of the city was 87.63% White, 3.65% African American, 0.51% Native American, 3.62% Asian, 0.25% Pacific Islander, 2.44% from other races, and 1.89% from two or more races. Hispanic or Latino of any race were 7.22% of the population.

There were 20,251 households, out of which 29.0% had children under the age of 18 living with them, 49.8% were married couples living together, 8.8% had a female householder with no husband present, and 38.2% were non-families. 31.6% of all households were made up of individuals, and 5.5% had someone living alone who was 65 years of age or older. The average household size was 2.30 and the average family size was 2.93.

In the city, the population was spread out, with 22.5% under the age of 18, 9.7% from 18 to 24, 32.9% from 25 to 44, 26.1% from 45 to 64, and 8.7% who were 65 years of age or older. The median age was 36 years. For every 100 females, there were 93.0 males. For every 100 females age 18 and over, there were 91.1 males.

The median income for a household in the city was $54,436, and the median income for a family was $71,017. Males had a median income of $45,938 versus $33,012 for females. The per capita income for the city was $29,466. About 2.4% of families and 3.7% of the population were below the poverty line, including 4.2% of those under age 18 and 5.6% of those age 65 or over.

Local government

The City of Bedford, Texas Home Rule Charter was adopted September 24, 1966. The city operates under a Council-Manager form of government and provides the following services by its charter: public safety, public works, health, culture, recreation, community development, water and sewer utilities.

According to the city's 2013-2014 Comprehensive Annual Financial Report, the city's various funds had $62.5 million in revenues, $56.9 million in expenditures, $127.4 million in total assets, $67.2 million in total liabilities, and $22.4 million in cash and investments.

Tax rollback of 2005 
In 2004, the Bedford city council determined that after years of cost-cutting, a property tax increase would be necessary. The council adopted a higher tax rate, but it triggered a tax rollback election in March 2005. The rollback provision passed and the city council revised the budget immediately due to the lack of funds, cutting city services including swimming pools, recreational centers, and the city library.  However, an anonymous donation of $300,000 allowed the reopening of the library, one pool, the recreational center, and senior center. Another $20,000 was raised through a resident fundraising drive to help reopen the library.  City records show they had budget surpluses in the following years.

Economy

Top employers
According to Bedford's 2021 Annual Comprehensive Financial Report, the top employers in the city are:

Education
Bedford is within the Hurst-Euless-Bedford Independent School District. School district facilities in Bedford include Pennington Field stadium, Gene A. Buinger Career and Technical Education Academy, two junior high schools, six elementary schools, and administrative offices. High School Students are also served by L.D. Bell High School in Hurst and Trinity High School or KEYS High School in Euless.

Notable people

 Scott Chandler, football player
 Colt David, football player
 Clint Ford, American actor and writer 
 Donnie Hart, MLB pitcher
 Courtney Kupets, Olympic gymnast and currently the head coach of the Georgia Gymdogs
 R. K. Milholland, author of the webcomic Something Positive
 Kyler Murray, Quarterback for the Arizona Cardinals, 9th overall pick in the 2018 Major League Baseball draft for the Oakland Athletics
 Betty Pariso, IFBB professional bodybuilder
 Splurge, rapper
 Jonathan Stickland, Republican member of the Texas House of Representatives from District 92, including Bedford, his city of residence
 Blake Swihart, baseball player
 Myles Turner, NBA basketball player for the Indiana Pacers
 Daniel Woolard, professional soccer player
 Dustin Ybarra, stand-up comedian and actor
 Cayden Boyd, actor

References

External links
 City of Bedford official website
 HEB Chamber of Commerce
 Bedford Public Library
 Historic photos of Bedford hosted by the Portal to Texas History
 Voters elect Mayor Jim Story to a full three-year term

Dallas–Fort Worth metroplex
Cities in Texas
Cities in Tarrant County, Texas